Charles Henry (1859–1926) was a French librarian and editor.  He was born at Bollwiller, Haut-Rhin, and was educated in Paris, where in 1881 he became assistant and afterward librarian in the Sorbonne.  As a specialist in the history of mathematics, he was sent to Italy to seek some manuscripts of that nature which the government wished to publish.  He edited several works upon kindred subjects, as well as memoirs, letters, and other volumes, and wrote critiques upon the musical theories of Rameau and Wronski.  He is also credited with the invention of several ingenious devices and instruments used in psychophysiological laboratories.  He published C. Huet's correspondence under the title Un érudit, homme du monde, homme d'église, homme de cour (1880), and he issued also Problèmes de géométrie pratique (1884) and Lettres inédites de Mlle. de Lespinasse à Condorcet et à D'Alembert (1887).

Charles Henry, a mathematician, inventor, esthetician, and intimate friend of the Symbolist and anarchist writers Félix Fénéon and Gustave Kahn, met Georges Seurat, Paul Signac and Camille Pissarro during the last Impressionist exhibition in 1886. Henry would take the final step in bringing emotional associational theory into the world of artistic sensation: something that would influence greatly the Neo-Impressionists. Henry and Seurat were in agreement that the basic elements of art—the line, particle of color, like words—could be treated autonomously, each possessing an abstract value independent of one another, if so chose the artist. In 1889 Fénéon noted that Seurat knew that the line, independent of its topographical role, possesses an assessable abstract value, in addition, to the individual pieces of color, and the relation of both to the observer's emotion.

The Neo-Impressionists established what was accepted as an objective scientific basis for their painting in the domain of color. The underlying theory behind Neo-Impressionism would have a lasting effect on the works produced in the coming years by the likes of Robert Delaunay. The Cubists were to do so in both form and dynamics, and the Orphists would do so with color too. The decomposition of spectral light expressed in Neo-Impressionist color theory of Paul Signac and Charles Henry played an important role in the formulation of Orphism. Robert Delaunay, Albert Gleizes, and Gino Severini all knew Henry personally.

Works 
Introduction à une esthétique scientifique, Paris, 1885
La Vérité sur le Marquis de Sade, Paris, E. Dentu, 1887
Rapporteur esthétique, Paris, Seguin, 1888
Cercle cromatique, Paris, Verdin, 1888
Esthétique et psychophysique, «Revue philosophique», 29, 1890
Harmonies de formes et de couleurs, Paris, 1891
L'esthétique des formes, «La Revue blanche», 7, 1894
Sensation et énergie, Paris, 1910
Mémoire et habitude, Paris, 1911
La lumière, la couleur et la forme, «L'esprit nouveau», 1921.

References 

 
R. Mirabaud, Henry et l'idealisme scientifique, Paris, 1926
C. Andry-Bourgeois, L'oeuvre de C. Henry et le probléme de la survie, Paris, 1931
F. Warrain, L'oeuvre psychobiophysique de C. Henry, Paris, 1931
J.F. Revel, Henry et la science des arts,  «L'oeil», 1964
W.I. Homer, Seurat and the Science of Painting, Cambridge (Mass.), 1964
J.A. Arguelles, C. Henry and the Formation of a Psychophysical Aesthetic, Chicago, 1972
C.V. Michael, The Marquis de Sade: The Man, His Works, and His Critics, New York, 1986

External links
 
 

1859 births
1926 deaths
People from Haut-Rhin
French librarians
Print editors
University of Paris people